Rootha Na Karo is a 1970 Bollywood drama directed by Sunder Dar. The film stars Shashi Kapoor and Nanda in lead roles.

Plot 
Neeta (Nanda) lives along with her widowed mother (Sulochana Latkar) and her cousin Naina (Kumari Naaz). Sudhir (Shashi Kapoor) was a poor young man and her long-term friend, now her fiancé. They both love each other deeply and Neeta's mother gives her consent to their marriage. But Naina always warns Neeta about Sudhir's intentions and says that he only loves her for her money. Neeta wouldn't listen to her and deeply trusts Sudhir.

She has another cousin Anil, who has passion for stage and theater. He is also friends with Sudhir and highly recommends him. Naina always tries to poison Neeta's mind by telling various examples of how charming young men play the game of love to cheat innocent young woman to steal away their property and succeeds to instill a bit of fear in Neeta's mind. One day, she takes Neeta to a lawyer, where Sudheer was preparing property documents. Naina tells Reeta that Sudheer was trying to change Neeta's property to his name. Reeta confronts Sudheer about that, but it is revealed that Sudheer was preparing documents to transfer everything to Anil, as he doesn't want to touch a penny of Neeta's money.

Neeta feels bad for insulting him like that, but Sudhir, feeling hurt, goes away. At last after a confrontation, Naina reveals that she always wanted Sudheer for herself and as Sudheer didn't reciprocate her feelings, she tried to separate him from Neeta by saying poisonous things to Neeta. She takes poison and dies in the hands of Neeta, telling her that she shouldn't lose a good person like Sudheer. Neeta rushes back to Sudheer and gives him an apology and requests him not to leave her. Anil also comes there and reveals how Naina poisoned her mind. At last, Sudheer is pacified and embraces Neeta.

Cast
Shashi Kapoor as Sudhir 
Nanda as Neeta 
Kumari Naaz as Naina 
Sulochana Latkar as Neeta's Mother 
Rajendra Nath as Anil 
Tun Tun as Neeta's Maidservant

Soundtrack
All lyrics written by Hasrat Jaipuri and music composed by C. Ramchandra.

External links
 

1970 films
1970s Hindi-language films
1970s romance films
Films scored by C. Ramchandra
Indian romance films
Hindi-language romance films